Nautilus (album) is the fifth official studio album of Serbian industrial group dreDDup. dreDDup stated in 2010 that there will be no more studio albums and that band is going into album recording hibernation. Nautilus came as the surprise coming so shortly after its predecessor dreDDup (album). It was recorded during the period 2011-2012 in DURU studio. The complete production and studio mastering/mixing was done by miKKa. Originally pictured as the album concerning the end of the world, but later changed into a story about the abandonment of the mankind's norms and voyage into the depths of the ocean. The artwork was created by the conceptual artist Bojana Jarošenko who also created the cover for the dreDDup (album). This album also concluded  some guest musicians such as Gaga Lee of Hype! , Simone from Lesboes in Action and cult actress Ljuma Penov. Album was first released by Glory & Honour records and then in 2014. re-released for Miner Recordings.

Track listing
 Awake - 3:14
 Echoes and Doors - 5:38
 Train to Madness - 4:29
 Angel for the Masses - 3:41
 Fire Up the Planet - 3:56
 Monsters Inside Me - 3:34
 Non-Negotiable - 5:05
 Hospital for The Broken - 3:48
 ReCharging You - 5:09
 Face Off - 4:37
 Nautilus - 6:07
 Cold Eyes - 6:06
 Two of Us - 6:30

Personnel
 Mihajlo Obrenov (aka: Inquisitor or miKKa) – lead vocals, electronics
 Ivan Francuski (aka: Frantz) – drums
 Alen Habek (aka: Armageddon) – lead guitar
 Aleksandra Vukošić (aka: XXXandra) – bass
 Gaga Lee – back vocals
 Simone – back vocals
 Ljuma Penov – back vocals

Sources
 https://dreddup.bandcamp.com/album/nautilus-2012
 http://www.facebook.com/dreddup
 https://web.archive.org/web/20190628232033/http://dreddup.com/

DreDDup albums